The Bulletin is a monthly community newspaper serving the neighborhoods of Bloomfield, Friendship, Garfield, Lawrenceville, and East Liberty in Pittsburgh, Pennsylvania.

It provides commentary on local community issues, with particular emphasis on economic redevelopment and anti-crime initiatives. The newspaper was founded in 1975 and is managed and owned by the Bloomfield-Garfield Corporation, an organization that works on projects to help improve the mentioned neighborhoods. Along with reports from professional staff writers, local community leaders also publish articles alerting readers of local events, issues, or activities. The Bulletin also contains advertisements and a calendar of local activities.

External links
 http://bgcbulletin.blogspot.com/  
 https://bloomfield-garfield.org/the-bulletin/

Newspapers published in Pittsburgh
Newspapers established in 1975
1975 establishments in Pennsylvania